Kenyan Sport Personality of the Year Awards, also known as SOYA Awards, are annual national awards given for sports personalities and organisations in Kenya. The awards were initiated in 2004 by Paul Tergat. The awards for each year are held at the beginning of the next year (e.g. 2008 awards took place in January 2009).

Awards winners
See footnote

2004
Sportsman of the year: Henry Wanyoike  (athletics)
Sportswoman of the year: Catherine Ndereba (athletics)
Sports team of the year (men): Kenya national rugby sevens team
Sports team of the year (women):  National volleyball team
Most Promising sportsman: Brimin Kipruto (athletics)
Hall of Fame inductee: Kipchoge Keino (athletics)

2005
Sportsman of the year: Benjamin Limo (athletics)
Sportswoman of the year: Catherine Ndereba (athletics)
Sports team of the year (men): Kenya Chiba Ekiden relay team (athletics)
Sports team of the year (women):  National volleyball team
Most Promising sportsman: Samuel Wanjiru (athletics)
Most Promising sportswoman: Veronica Nyaruai Wanjiru (athletics)
Hall of Fame inductee: Joe Kadenge (football)
Sports Federation: Kenya Secondary Schools Sports Association (general)
Special Category: Edwin Kipchumba (athletics, paralympic)

2006
Sportsman of the year: Alex Kipchirchir (athletics)
Sportswoman of the year: Janeth Jepkosgei (athletics)
Sports team of the year (men): Junior World Cross Country team (athletics)
Sports team of the year (women): Kenya Commercial Bank (volleyball) 
Most Promising sportsman: David Dunford (swimming)
Most Promising sportswoman: Pauline Korikwiang (athletics)
Hall of Fame inductee: Hardial Singh (field hockey)
Sports Federation: Athletics Kenya
Special Category: Francis Thuo  (athletics, paralympic)

2007
Sportsman of the year: Jason Dunford (swimming)
Sportswoman of the year: Janeth Jepkosgei (athletics)
Sports team of the year (men): Kenya national rugby sevens team
Sports team of the year (women): Junior World Cross Country team (athletics)
Most Promising sportsman: Asbel Kiprop (athletics)
Most Promising sportswoman: Ruth Bosibori (athletics)
Hall of Fame inductee: Paul Wekesa (tennis)
Sports Federation: Kenya Motorsports Foundation
Special Category (men): Abraham Tarbei (athletics, paralympic)
Special Category (women): Betty Cheruiyot (athletics, paralympic)
Community Hero: Tegla Loroupe (athletics, paralympic)

2008
Sportsman of the year: Samuel Wanjiru (athletics)
Sportswoman of the year: Pamela Jelimo (athletics)
Sports team of the year (men): Kenya national rugby sevens team
Sports team of the year (women):  Kenya Prisons (volleyball)
Most Promising sportsman: Josephat Bett (athletics)
Most Promising sportswoman: Achieng Ajulu-Bushell (swimming)
Hall of Fame inductee: Jonathan Niva (football)
Sports Federation: Kenya Rugby Football Union
Special Category (men): Henry Kiprono Kirwa (athletics, paralympic)
Special Category (women): Mary Nakhumicha Zakayo (athletics, paralympic)
Community Hero: Juma Abdalla Kent (basketball)
Coach of the Year: Julius Kirwa (athletics)

2009

2010

2019

Individual winners

See also
Kenya national athletics team

References

External links 
Kenyan Sport Personality of the Year Awards
Safaricom are again sponsoring the Safaricom SOYA Awards, to be held on January 15, 2016, in Nairobi, to the tune of Ksh 15M.

 
National sportsperson-of-the-year trophies and awards
Awards established in 2004
2004 establishments in Kenya